The 1990 NBA playoffs was the postseason tournament of the National Basketball Association's 1989–90 season. The tournament concluded with the Eastern Conference champion Detroit Pistons defeating the Western Conference champion Portland Trail Blazers 4 games to 1 in the NBA Finals. Isiah Thomas was named NBA Finals MVP.

It was the Blazers' first trip to the NBA Finals since their victory in the 1977 NBA Finals.

The New York Knicks fell behind 2–0 to the Boston Celtics in their first round matchup, but took the series 3–2 by winning Game 5 121-114 in Boston Garden.  Prior to this, the Celtics had beaten the Knicks 26 straight at the Boston Garden.  This deciding game featured a missed dunk by Larry Bird late in the fourth with the Celtics trailing by four (103-99) and a clinching 3-point basket by Patrick Ewing on a play where he chased down an errant pass by Charles Oakley on the sideline in front of the Knicks' bench and hurled up a desperation shot as the shot clock was reaching zero.  The basket put the Knicks up 113-101 and essentially clinched the game and the series.

The Phoenix Suns defeated the Los Angeles Lakers in a playoff series for the first time ever. It also marked the first time since 1981 that the Lakers failed to reach the Western Conference Finals, ending the longest such run since the Bill Russell-led Boston Celtics, who made the Eastern Conference Finals thirteen consecutive times between 1957 and 1969.

It was the first NBA Finals to not feature the Lakers or Celtics since 1979.

The Chicago Bulls lost Game 7 of the Eastern Conference Finals 93–76 in Detroit, making it the third straight year they were ousted in the playoffs by the Pistons.

The Indiana Pacers made only their third playoff appearance since their NBA debut in the 1976–77 season; they proceeded to make the playoffs 16 out of the next 17 years (missing only in 1997).

The Dallas Mavericks made their only playoff appearance of the decade. They did not return until 2001.

Game 5 of the NBA Finals was the last NBA game to be televised on CBS.

Bracket

First round

Eastern Conference first round

(1) Detroit Pistons vs. (8) Indiana Pacers

This was the first playoff meeting between the Pistons and the Pacers.

(2) Philadelphia 76ers vs. (7) Cleveland Cavaliers

This was the first playoff meeting between the Cavaliers and the 76ers.

(3) Chicago Bulls vs. (6) Milwaukee Bucks

This was the third playoff meeting between these two teams, with the Bucks winning the first two meetings.

(4) Boston Celtics vs. (5) New York Knicks

This was the 13th playoff meeting between these two teams, with the Celtics winning seven of the first 12 meetings.

Western Conference first round

(1) Los Angeles Lakers vs. (8) Houston Rockets

This was the third playoff meeting between these two teams, with the Rockets winning the first two meetings.

(2) San Antonio Spurs vs. (7) Denver Nuggets

This was the third playoff meeting between these two teams, with each team winning one series apiece.

(3) Portland Trail Blazers vs. (6) Dallas Mavericks

This was the second playoff meeting between these two teams, with the Trail Blazers winning the first meeting.

(4) Utah Jazz vs. (5) Phoenix Suns

 Kevin Johnson hits the series-winning shot with 8 tenths left.

This was the second playoff meeting between these two teams, with the Suns winning the first meeting.

Conference semifinals

Eastern Conference semifinals

(1) Detroit Pistons vs. (5) New York Knicks

This was the second playoff meeting between these two teams, with the Knicks winning the first meeting.

(2) Philadelphia 76ers vs. (3) Chicago Bulls

This was the first playoff meeting between the Bulls and the 76ers.

Western Conference semifinals

(1) Los Angeles Lakers vs. (5) Phoenix Suns

 This was Phoenix’s first win at Great Western Forum in 22 attempts, dating back to Game 5 of the 1984 Western Conference Finals on May 23 of that year.

 Michael Cooper's final NBA game.

This was the seventh playoff meeting between these two teams, with the Lakers winning the first six meetings.

(2) San Antonio Spurs vs. (3) Portland Trail Blazers

This was the first playoff meeting between the Trail Blazers and the Spurs.

Conference finals

Eastern Conference finals

(1) Detroit Pistons vs. (3) Chicago Bulls

This was the fourth playoff meeting between these two teams, with the Pistons winning two of the first three meetings.

Western Conference finals

(3) Portland Trail Blazers vs. (5) Phoenix Suns

 Kevin Duckworth hits the game-winner with 17.3 seconds left.

 Terry Porter hits the game-winner with 12.7 seconds left.

This was the third playoff meeting between these two teams, with the Suns winning the first two meetings.

NBA Finals: (E1) Detroit Pistons vs. (W3) Portland Trail Blazers

 Terry Porter hits the game-tying free throws with 10.2 seconds left in regulation to force OT; Clyde Drexler hits the game-winning free throws with 2.1 seconds left in OT.

 This was Detroit's first win in Portland since October 19, 1974, the second game of Bill Walton's career.

 Danny Young's buzzed beater is disqualified.

 Vinnie Johnson hits the title-winning shot with 0.7 seconds left, capping off a 9-0 run in the final two minutes.

This was the first playoff meeting between the Pistons and the Trail Blazers.

References

External links
 Basketball-Reference's 1990 NBA Playoffs page

National Basketball Association playoffs
Playoffs
Sports in Portland, Oregon
GMA Network television specials

fi:NBA-kausi 1989–1990#Pudotuspelit